The Tuqi King was a high office of the Xiongnu, a title also known to the Chinese as "worthy/wise prince/king". In the 6th to 8th centuries, Chinese annalists used the expression 贤王 Xian wang only in reference to the Eastern Turkic Khaganate.

The Tuqi King of the Left was generally designated as the successor of the chanyu. Two titles were awarded with each of them a commander-in-chief who derived his power from the eastern and western territories respectively. These served as two wings alongside the chanyu's main domain. The Chinese annalistic explanation was a "Worthy Prince of the Left (East)" and "Worthy Prince of the Right (West)".  This organization of the state was traditional for the Eurasian nomadic states from the Huns to the Turkic Khanates.

Etymology
N.Ya. Philologists also noted a close phonetical resemblance with another ancient Turkic title, togrul, which is homophonic with the Turkic word togrul "falcon". Other philologists interpret the dā-grjəj as representing Old Turkic ,  (< ), Turkish, Azeri, Turkmen, Gagauz doğru, Tuvinian , etc., all meaning "overt, honest, just". This interpretation had initially been suggested by Friedrich von Schlegel (1772–1829), and accepted by Kurakichi Shiratori and others as direct semantical and phonetical correspondence.

Social function
The Left Wise Prince belonged to the Chanyu clan, and in accordance with the lateral succession order, was an heir apparent to the reigning Chanyu; on the death of the reigning Chanyu, he was raised to the throne, and every member in the hierarchy of the Left Wing advanced one step up. Unlike the Left Wing, the members of the Right Wing belonged to the Khatun clan Huyan or later Xubu, were traditionally not eligible for the throne, and could be raised to the throne only as a result of a court coup. Accordingly, the Left Wise Prince commanded a larger contingent of the army, and during military actions in the absence of the Chanyu held a post of a Supreme Commander. Unlike the Right Wing Wise Prince, who held a position akin to a Supreme Judge and Prime Minister, and was involved in the daily rule of the country, the Left Wise Prince was detached from the daily operations, and his prime function during war and peace was a control of the army. Being a Luanti by birth, with a Suibi Khatun mother, the Left Wise Prince was always a prime target for his younger siblings with the same pedigree. Both Left and Right Wise Princes were fairly autonomous in their actions, had a right to appoint their subordinates at their will, were free to conduct their own local wars and retaliatory raids, and were in charge of the various tribes assigned to their respective Wings. The two dynastic clans formed a permanent dynastic union of the state, ensuring its stability, and being an object of political games by their southern neighbour. Suggestion for the establishment of the Tuqi King from the ruler of the Xiongnu is currently unknown. Speculation stated, it might be kept an watchful eye on the Donghu tribe for trying to reclaimed back their land or rebellion after submitting to Chanyu and becoming a vassal for over eight decade after losing the battle during the chaos of China. Until Huo Qubing defeated the Nomadic Worthy Prince of the east, Xianbei, the successor of the Donghu people was able to reclaimed back their own land and break apart from Xiongnu to establish their own confederacy to declared independent.

Notes

References
 Chen, Liankai (1999). Outlines on China's Ethnicities. Beijing: China Financial and Economic Publishing House. .
 Ma, Liqing (2005). Original Xiongnu, An Archaeological Explore on the Xiongnu's History and Culture. Hohhot: Inner Mongolia University Press. .

Xiongnu
Chinese royal titles